The 2015 Cup of Nations was the third Cup of Nations tournament, but the first held outside the United Arab Emirates. Unlike 2011 and 2012, the Cup of Nations was staged in Hong Kong at the Hong Kong Football Club Stadium from November 13 to 21. The tournament acted as a year ending tournament for tier 3 teams from different continents and provides greater preparation for teams to play in their regional competitions, especially this year participants who aim to qualify for the 2019 Rugby World Cup haven failed to qualify for the 2015 Rugby World Cup.

The four competing teams were hosts Hong Kong, who won the tournament in 2011, Zimbabwe who competed in 2012, while Portugal and Russia are new to the tournament having not competed in either of the 2015 World Rugby Tbilisi Cup or 2015 World Rugby Nations Cup.

Format
The tournament is being played as a single round-robin, with the winner being the leading team after the third round of fixtures.

The points for the tournament were awarded for:
 Win =  4 points
 Draw = 2 points
 Loss = 1 point
 Scoring 4 or more tries in one game = 1 bonus point
 Losing by 7 or less points = 1 bonus point

Standings

Pre-tournament rankings in parentheses

Fixtures

Round 1

Round 2

Round 3

See also
 2015 end-of-year rugby union internationals

References

2015
2015 rugby union tournaments for national teams
International rugby union competitions hosted by Hong Kong
rugby union
2015 in Asian rugby union
2015 in Russian rugby union
rugby union
rugby union
November 2015 sports events in China